Protonoma is a genus of moths of the family Yponomeutidae.

Species
Protonoma glomeratrix - Meyrick, 1938 

Yponomeutidae